The Conference Carolinas men's basketball tournament is the annual conference basketball championship tournament for Conference Carolinas (formerly the North State Intercollegiate Conference, Carolinas Intercollegiate Athletic Conference, and the Carolinas-Virginia Athletics Conference). The tournament has been held annually since 1936 with two gaps between 1937–40 and 1944–46. It is a single-elimination tournament and seeding is based on regular season records.

The winner, declared conference champion, receives the conference's automatic bid to the NCAA Men's Division II Basketball Championship.

Results

Championship records

 Former CC members are highlighted in pink.
 Chowan, Converse, and Francis Marion have yet to reach the tournament final.
 Presbyterian and Coker never reached the tournament finals before departing the conference.

See also
 Conference Carolinas women's basketball tournament

References

NCAA Division II men's basketball conference tournaments
Tournament
Recurring sporting events established in 1936